The 1929 Haskell Indians football team was an American football that represented the Haskell Institute (now known as Haskell Indian Nations University) during the 1929 college football season. In its first year under head coach William Henry Dietz, the team compiled a 7–2 record. Halfback Louis Weller, a Caddo Indian, was the team captain. The team played its two home games at night at Haskell Stadium in Lawrence, Kansas.

Schedule

References

Haskell
Haskell Indian Nations Fighting Indians football seasons
Haskell Indians football